Lab Rats, also known as Lab Rats: Bionic Island for the fourth season, is an American comedy television series created by Chris Peterson and Bryan Moore that aired on Disney XD from February 27, 2012 to February 3, 2016. The series stars Billy Unger, Spencer Boldman, Kelli Berglund, Tyrel Jackson Williams, and Hal Sparks.

Plot 
A young teenager named Leo Dooley lives a normal life until the day his mother Tasha gets married to billionaire inventor Donald Davenport, with whom they move in. While trying to find his bedroom, Leo accidentally discovers teenage siblings with bionic superpowers living in his new basement. The series follows the bionic teens as they unravel in adventurous situations in an attempt to live life like a normal family in the fictional town of Mission Creek, California.

As the series progresses, the series introduces various new characters, including Davenport's younger brother Douglas and Douglas' android son Marcus; Krane and his bionic soldiers Taylor, formerly known as S-1, and Sebastian, formerly known as S-3; and scientist Giselle and her android Troy West. In the third season, Davenport opens up a bionic academy on a bionic island to train Krane's soldiers to be the world's new bionic heroes.

Episodes

Cast

Main 
 Billy Unger as Chase
 Spencer Boldman as Adam
 Kelli Berglund as Bree
 Tyrel Jackson Williams as Leo
 Hal Sparks as Davenport

Recurring 
 Angel Parker as Tasha
 Maile Flanagan as Principal Perry
 Jeremy Kent Jackson as Douglas Davenport

Production 
On May 10, 2010, Disney XD green-lit a pilot under the title of Billion Dollar Freshmen, created by Chris Peterson and Bryan Moore, as executive producers alongside Mark Brazill. The pilot was filmed in the summer of 2010. On July 13, 2011, Disney XD officially ordered Lab Rats, with production to begin in September 2011 in Hollywood for a 2012 premiere. Starring in the series are Tyrel Jackson Williams as Leo, Billy Unger as Chase, Spencer Boldman as Adam, Kelli Berglund as Bree, and Hal Sparks as Davenport.

On May 18, 2012, Disney XD renewed the series for a second season. On July 26, 2013, Disney XD renewed the series for a third season. On May 9, 2014, Disney XD renewed the series for a fourth season. On June 25, 2015, Kelli Berglund stated in an interview that the fourth season would be the final season.

Broadcast 

The series originally premiered on Disney XD on February 27, 2012, and on Disney Channel on March 2, 2012. In Canada, it first aired on Disney XD on February 24, 2012. It later stopped airing on Disney XD in Canada and moved to Disney Channel due to DHX Media losing Disney rights. In the United Kingdom and Ireland, it first aired as a preview on March 29, 2012, and officially premiered on April 19, 2012. In South Africa, it premiered on Disney XD on June 10, 2012. In Australia and New Zealand, it first aired on Disney Channel on December 31, 2012, and officially premiered on January 10, 2013.

Reception

Critical 
Variety television critic Brian Lowry knocked the series' one-hour premiere for failing "to exhibit basic elements of coherence" and for featuring "too many lapses in logic".

Ratings 
The series launch of Lab Rats in February 2012 was the most-watched series premiere in Disney XD history, drawing 1.27 million viewers and performing well in key demographics. The followup encore of the premiere that aired on Disney Channel on March 2, 2012, ranked as the number-one telecast in kids 2–11 for the week of February 27–March 4, 2012, drawing 2.3 million viewers in the demographic.

 

| link2             = List of Lab Rats episodes#Season 2 (2013–14)
| episodes2         = 25
| start2            = 
| end2              = 
| startrating2      = 1.01
| endrating2        = 0.74
| viewers2          = |2}} 

| link3             = List of Lab Rats episodes#Season 3 (2014–15)
| episodes3         = 20
| start3            = 
| end3              = 
| startrating3      = 1.05
| endrating3        = 0.81
| viewers3          = |2}} 

| link4             = List of Lab Rats episodes#Season 4 (2015–16)
| episodes4         = 22
| start4            = 
| end4              = 
| startrating4      = 0.86
| endrating4        = 0.71
| viewers4          = |2}} 
}}

Awards and nominations

Lab Rats: Elite Force spinoff series 
On September 3, 2015, it was announced that Lab Rats would have a joint spinoff series with Mighty Med under the title of Lab Rats: Elite Force. Only Billy Unger and Kelli Berglund from Lab Rats were reported to be returning for the new series, alongside Bradley Steven Perry, Jake Short, and Paris Berelc from Mighty Med. It was subsequently announced that Lab Rats: Elite Force would premiere on Disney XD on March 2, 2016.

References

External links 
 

2010s American children's comedy television series
2012 American television series debuts
2016 American television series endings
Disney XD original programming
English-language television shows
Television series about families
Television series about siblings
Television series by It's a Laugh Productions